Lammy may refer to:

 David Lammy (born 1972), British Labour MP
 Lambda Literary Award
 Lammy, the main protagonist of the PSX game Um Jammer Lammy and guitarist of virtual band MilkCan
 Lammy, a Happy Tree Friends character 
 "Come Back Clammy Lammy", a song by Cardiacs from Guns